The Peoria Zoo (formerly Glen Oak Zoo) is a zoo located in Peoria, Illinois, in the United States. The zoo is owned and operated by the Peoria Park District and is open daily except Thanksgiving, Christmas Eve, Christmas Day, New Year's Eve, and New Years Day.

The Peoria Zoo has been accredited by the Association of Zoos and Aquariums (AZA) since 1976.

History

In 2009, the zoo opened the new Africa exhibit, nearly doubling its size. At the same time it changed its name to "Peoria Zoo."

The zoo's adult female Amur (Siberian) tiger, Kyra, mother of four cubs (two males - whose conservation plan called for them to eventually be relocated to other zoos - and two females), died suddenly on the evening of Sunday, August 18, 2013, of what preliminary was believed to be a serious acute infection that turned septic. The four cubs are now considered orphans, as their father is kept in a separate enclosure for their safety; the plan for the cubs to be separated may have to be delayed and/or altered.

Exhibits

Africa
The Africa exhibit opened in 2009 after more than a decade of planning and two and a half years of construction. In this exhibit, the visitors walk around the main area on a boardwalk, and can see across the entire expanse of the enclosure. The main area is divided into two sections, the northern section containing giraffes and gazelles, and the southern section being home to zebras and rhinos. Lions have their own enclosure, as do the mandrills. red river hogs and colobus monkeys share a home, and the African crested porcupines and Aldabra giant tortoise also live together.

A small animal building houses smaller animals such as the zebra mouse, Zambian mole-rats, pancake tortoises, dung beetles, Madagascar hissing cockroaches, African rock pythons, Madagascar tree boas, and Taveta golden weavers.

Australia Walkabout

An exhibit that opened in 2012, home to a walkthroiugh exhibit for Bennett's wallabies and Parma wallabies, Black swans and Emus and an aviary for Budgerigars.

Asian Trail

The smallest exhibit in the zoo, with three exhibits for Siberian tigers, Sichuan Takins, and Reeves's Muntjacs.

Tropics Building

Conservation Center

A building for endangered species, mostly reptiles and amphibians.

Contact Barn

Misc.

Other facilities

Zambezi River Lodge
The Zambezi River Lodge overlooks the Africa exhibit. The facility provides concessions, and is also available for receptions and conferences.

Notes

References

External links
 

Zoos in Illinois
Peoria, Illinois
Tourist attractions in Peoria, Illinois
Protected areas of Peoria County, Illinois
Culture of Peoria, Illinois
1955 establishments in Illinois